Nina's Little Fables was a 10-minute TV show aired during The Good Night Show on PBS Kids Sprout, starring Michele Lepe as Nina and Star, reading fables. The show ran from June 28, 2010 to December 12, 2013 and featured fables, notably from Aesop's Fables. It is based on the series created by Smartoonz, Little Fables.

Episode List
 The Sparrow and the Feathers
 The Mouse, The Hare and The Raven

2010s American animated television series
2010s American anthology television series
2010 American television series debuts
2013 American television series endings
2010s preschool education television series
American children's animated anthology television series
American preschool education television series
Animated preschool education television series